Michael Dempsey (born 1958) is a British musician who played with The Cure and Associates.

Michael Dempsey may also refer to:
Michael Dempsey (bishop) (1918–1974), American Catholic bishop
Mick Dempsey (Gaelic footballer), Gaelic football player
Mick Dempsey (hurler) (born 1941), Irish retired hurler
Mike Dempsey (graphic designer), British graphic designer
Mike Dempsey (intelligence), former acting Director of National Intelligence
Michael James Dempsey (1912–1996), American-born bishop of the Catholic Church
Michael Dempsey (table tennis) (1956–2009), American table tennis player